The members of the 23rd Knesset were elected on 2 March 2020.

Members of the Knesset

Replacements

See also 
Thirty-fifth government of Israel

References

 
23